Charles Scribner is the name of several members of a New York publishing family associated with Charles Scribner's Sons:

Charles Scribner I (1821–1871)
Charles Scribner II (1854–1930)
Charles Scribner III (1890–1952)
Charles Scribner IV (1921–1995)